Nagatomo is a Japanese surname. Notable people with the surname include:

, Japanese footballer
, Japanese actor and voice actor
Tomoko Nagatomo (born 1972), Japanese archaeologist
, Japanese sport wrestler
, Japanese  footballer

Nagatomo is also a masculine Japanese given name. Notable people with the name include:

 (1643–1675), Japanese daimyō

See also
8932 Nagatomo, a main-belt asteroid

Japanese-language surnames
Japanese masculine given names